Jerome Conley (born 1965, Muncie, Indiana) is a former Mayor of Oxford, Ohio.  He is the Dean of University Libraries at Miami University. Appointed in 2013, Dean Conley has been working for Miami University in several capacities starting in 1992.  He was given an honorary alumnus award on May 3, 2018.

Personal life
Conley graduated from Indiana University with a B.S. in political science with an area in Ulitic studies. He has 3 siblings, two brothers and a sister. He is a Methodist and an Indiana Pacers fan.

External links
 Official biography
 https://www.lib.miamioh.edu/dean/bio

Living people
1966 births
Mayors of places in Ohio
Indiana University alumni
Miami University faculty
African-American mayors in Ohio
African-American people in Ohio politics
People from Oxford, Ohio
21st-century African-American people
20th-century African-American people